Anaam is a 1992 Indian Hindi-language film directed by Ramesh Modi and produced by Vinod S. Choudhary. It stars Armaan Kohli and Ayesha Jhulka. It is based on the Hindi novel Vidhwa Ka Pati written by Ved Prakash Sharma.

Cast
 Armaan Kohli...	Sikandar H. Ali / Jony K. D'Souza / Aakash / Rocky / Prince
 Ayesha Jhulka...	Meghna
 Kiran Kumar...Hyder Ali
 Sadashiv Amrapurkar... Inspector Angre
 Kulbhushan Kharbanda...D.K. Saxena
 Laxmikant Berde...Rajan 'Raju'
 Tej Sapru...Pasha
 Ajit Vachani...	Inspector K.K. Diwan
 Anjana Mumtaz...Meghna's Mother
 Yunus Parvez...Liyaqat Ali Khan / Mohan Makhichand
 Mushtaq Khan...	Inspector P.C. Yadav
 Reshma Singh...Janice J. D'Souza
 Arun Bakshi...Dr. Harry Thomas
 Subbiraj...	Dr. Bhardwaj

Soundtrack
The soundtrack was composed by Nadeem-Shravan. The lyrics were penned by Sameer.

References

External links

1990s Hindi-language films
Films scored by Nadeem–Shravan
1992 films
Films based on Indian novels